Wolfgang Schluchter (born 4 April 1938 in Ludwigsburg, Germany) is a German sociologist and, as of 2006, professor emeritus at the University of Heidelberg. Schluchter is recognized as a leading sociologist of religion and an authority on the history of sociological theory, in particular on the work of Max Weber. He was visiting professor at several universities worldwide, including the University of Pittsburgh, the New School for Social Research, and the University of California at Berkeley.

Selected works in English translation 
 Max Weber’s Vision of History. Ethics and Methods. University of California Press, Berkeley, 1979.  (with Guenther Roth)
 The Rise of Western Rationalism: Max Weber's Developmental History. University of California Press, Berkeley, 1985. 
 Rationalism, Religion, and Domination. A Weberian Perspective. University of California Press, Berkeley, 1989.
 Paradoxes of Modernity. Culture and Conduct in the Theory of Max Weber. Stanford University Press, Stanford, 1996.
 Max Weber and Islam. Transaction Publishers, New Brunswick, N.J., 1995  (edited with Toby Huff)	
 Public Spheres and Collective Identities. Transaction Publishers, New Brunswick, NJ, 2000 (edited with Shmuel N. Eisenstadt and Björn Wittrock)

External links 
Personal page at Heidelberg University with links to CV and complete list of publications, retrieved 16 October 2013

1938 births
Max Weber
German sociologists
Academic staff of Heidelberg University
Living people